Rockland Lake State Park is a  state park located in the hamlets of Congers and Valley Cottage in the eastern part of the Town of Clarkstown in Rockland County, New York, United States. The park is located on a ridge of Hook Mountain above the west bank of the Hudson River. Included within the park is the  Rockland Lake.

Development of the park as part of the Palisades Interstate Park system began in 1958. Rockland Lake State Park is functionally part of a continuous complex of parks that also includes Hook Mountain State Park, Nyack Beach State Park, and Haverstraw Beach State Park.

History
Rockland Lake was known as "Quashpeake Pond" to the region's Native American population, prior to the lake being given its current name, which refers to the county in which it is situated. The adjacent hamlet of Rockland Lake was originally known as "Slaughter's Landing" before its name was changed to match the lake.

Ice production

Prior to the establishment of the park, Rockland Lake served as an important supplier of ice to New York City after the Knickerbocker Ice Company was established on the lake's northeastern bank in 1831. Rockland Lake eventually became known as the "Icehouse of New York City", with a reputation for having the cleanest and purest ice in the area.

During the 1850s, the Knickerbocker Ice Company operated a dozen steamboats, 75 ice barges, and employed 3,000 people. Ice harvests typically began in January, and blocks of ice were stored in large icehouses before being shipped to customers during warmer weather. The icehouses, insulated with sawdust, could store up to 50,000 tons of ice.

The nearby Knickerbocker Fire House was established 1862.

The Knickerbocker Ice Company closed in 1924. In 1926, workers who were demolishing one of the ice houses accidentally set fire to the structure's sawdust insulation. The fire spread extremely quickly and destroyed much of the village of Rockland Lake. The old foundation of the ice company remains today, marked by a historical plaque and bench.

Recreational history

Rockland Lake has been formally used for recreation since 1873, when a picnic area known as "The Grove" was established near the north end of the lake. This was followed by the installation of a second recreation area near the south end of the lake known as the "Quaspeck Park Beach Club and Casino". At the turn of the 20th century, special trains delivered visitors to the lake's recreation areas.

By 1964, a total of  had been purchased to form the park.

Park description
Rockland Lake State Park features a  swimming pool, in addition to a smaller pool for children. The park also has scattered picnic tables and grills, a car-top boat launch and boat rentals, hiking trails with views of the Hudson Valley, and six tennis courts. Anglers on Rockland Lake may catch bass, perch and norlunge, while walkers, bikers and joggers may use the  paved trail that circles the lake.

Rockland Lake also has its own fire department, Knickerbocker Engine Company 1, located at the rear of the park. It is the second-oldest fire department in Rockland County and is still in operation today.

Golf courses
Rockland Lake features two 18-hole golf courses, the Championship and Executive courses. The Championship course is a regulation golf course measuring 6,864 yards from the back tees, with a par of 72. It also features a driving range and clubhouse with snack bar. The Executive course is par 3 and measures 2,780 yards.

See also
List of New York state parks

References

External links
 New York State Parks: Rockland Lake State Park
 Palisades Parks Conservancy: Rockland Lake State Park
 The Friends of Rockland Lake and Hook Mountain, Inc.
 Knickerbocker Ice Festival
 NY-NJTC: Rockland Lake State Park details and trail info

Palisades Interstate Park system
Parks in Rockland County, New York
Golf clubs and courses in New York (state)
Nature centers in New York (state)
Ice trade
1958 establishments in New York (state)
Rugby league in New York (state)
Former villages in New York (state)
Villages in Rockland County, New York